Bruno Monden (1900–1980) was a German art director. He designed the sets for several rubble films in the wake of the Second World War.

Selected filmography
 The Stars Shine (1938)
 The Murderers Are Among Us (1946)
 Wozzeck (1947)
 Raid (1947)
 Morituri (1958)
 Royal Children (1950)
 King for One Night (1950)
 Cuba Cabana (1952)
 The Blue and White Lion (1952)
 No Greater Love (1952)
 Street Serenade (1953)
 A Woman of Today (1954)
 André and Ursula (1955)
 San Salvatore (1956)
 A Piece of Heaven (1957)
 Restless Night (1958)
 The Green Devils of Monte Cassino (1958)
 Conny and Peter Make Music (1960)
 Agatha, Stop That Murdering! (1960)
 The Last of Mrs. Cheyney (1961)
 Don't Tell Me Any Stories (1964)
 When Ludwig Goes on Manoeuvres (1967)

References

Bibliography 
 Shandley, Robert R. Rubble Films: German Cinema in the Shadow of the Third Reich. Temple University Press, 2001.

External links 
 

Film people from Berlin
1900 births
1980 deaths
German art directors